Dorvan I. Solberg is a North Dakota Democratic-NPL Party member of the North Dakota House of Representatives, representing the 2nd district since 1998. He is currently a candidate for district 2 Senate.

External links
North Dakota Legislative Assembly - Representative Dorvan Solberg official ND Senate website
Project Vote Smart - Representative Dorvan I. Solberg (ND) profile
Follow the Money - Dorvan Solberg
2006 2004 2000 1998 campaign contributions
North Dakota Democratic-NPL Party - Representative Dorvan Solberg profile

Members of the North Dakota House of Representatives
1934 births
Living people
American Lutherans
People from Williston, North Dakota